Father Emmeram of Thurn and Taxis OSB, until his profession Prince Max Emanuel Maria Siegfried Joseph Antonius Ignatius Lamoral of Thurn and Taxis (1 March 1902, Regensburg, Kingdom of Bavaria – 3 October 1994, Regensburg, Bavaria, Germany) was a German Benedictine and member of the Princely House of Thurn and Taxis.

Early life
Max Emanuel was the fifth eldest son (fourth, if counting only children who lived to adulthood) of Albert, 8th Prince of Thurn and Taxis, and his wife Archduchess Margarethe Klementine of Austria. He had six brothers and one sister. Max Emanuel's eldest brother was Franz Joseph, 9th Prince of Thurn and Taxis.

Monastic life
Max Emanuel joined the Order of Saint Benedict in 1923 and became a member of Neresheim Abbey. For his religious name, he chose Emmeram after Saint Emmeram of Regensburg, patron saint of St. Emmeram Castle (previously a monastery), the residence of the princely family.

In 1951, Max Emanuel received the papal concession for the reestablishment of the former monastery Prüfening Abbey. Later in the 1950s, he established the Liturgiewissenschaftliche Institut Regensburg-Prüfening. For over 30 years of his life, Max Emanuel resided isolated at the family-owned St. Emmeram's Abbey in Regensburg. His desire to revive the monastic life was not fulfilled, however, so he opened Prüfening Abbey as a meeting place and home for the youth and poor. Max Emanuel died in 1994 and was buried at Neresheim Abbey.

Ancestry

References

1902 births
1994 deaths
People from Regensburg
Princes of Thurn und Taxis
20th-century German Roman Catholic priests
German Benedictines
German Christian monks